The discography of Little Man Tate, an English-based Indie Rock band, consists of 2 studio albums and 10 singles along with several accompanying music videos.

Studio albums

Singles

Music videos

Rare Songs/B-Sides

References

 
Discographies of British artists
Rock music group discographies